Dorothy "Dottie" "Kammie" Kamenshek (December 21, 1925 – May 17, 2010) was an American All-American Girls Professional Baseball League player. She batted and threw left-handed.

Early life
A native of Cincinnati, Ohio, Kamenshek played outfield for a local softball league, and at the age of 17 she was spotted by a scout from the All-American Girls Professional Baseball League.  After tryouts at Wrigley Field in Chicago, she joined the Rockford Peaches as an outfielder when the league began in 1943, but was soon playing first base.  She and short stop Snooky Harrell formed the league's best double-play combination.

Kamenshek played in the AAGPBL for 10 seasons, and was selected as an All-Star all seven times the league established such a team.  In 1946 she was the league's top batter with an average of .316 (a single point ahead of Audrey Wagner), and won the distinction again in 1947 with an average of .306.  She struck out only 81 times in 3,736 at-bat appearances.

Considered one of the best athletes of her time, southpaw Kamenshek was even recruited for men's baseball by a team from Fort Lauderdale, Florida.  She believed the team only wanted her for publicity and turned down the offer. Former New York Yankee Wally Pipp was so impressed with her, that he stated she was the most accomplished player he had ever seen among men or women.

In the off‑seasons, Kamenshek studied physical education and health education at the University of Cincinnati. In 1951 she was forced to reduce her playing due to back injuries, and after the 1952 season she retired permanently from the game with a career average of .292.

Education
In 1958, Kamenshek received a degree in physical therapy from Marquette University in Milwaukee.  She returned to Ohio to serve as a physical therapist in Hamilton County and later moved to Los Angeles to perform the same work at the Los Angeles Crippled Children's Services Department. In 1964, she was promoted to supervisor of physical and occupational therapy for Los Angeles County Children's Services, and later to chief of therapy services, the position she held when she retired in 1980.

Legacy
After her retirement, Kamenshek was honored by Los Angeles County with the Outstanding Management Award (1980). She is part of the AAGPBL permanent display at the Baseball Hall of Fame and Museum at Cooperstown, New York. The display opened in 1988, and is dedicated to the entire league rather than any individual player.

The 1992 film A League of Their Own introduced a new generation to the history of women's baseball. Geena Davis played Dottie Hinson, the best ballplayer in the league, a character loosely based on Kamenshek.

In 1999, Sports Illustrated for Women selected Kamenshek as the 100th greatest female athlete of the 20th century.

She was inducted into the National Women's Baseball Hall of Fame in 2013

Death
Kamenshek died on May 17, 2010 at the age of 84. She was buried at Forest Lawn Cemetery in Cathedral City, California. Her spouse and fellow Hall of Fame member, Margaret Wenzell, was buried next to her in 2014.

Biographies
Kammie on First (2014, Ohio University Press), by Michelle Houts, a biography for middle school children.

Sources

 
 A Whole New Ball Game: The Story of the All-American Girls Professional Baseball League, by Sue Macy

See also
Dorothy Ferguson

References

External links

"Dorothy Kamenshek" Encyclopædia Britannica

1925 births
2010 deaths
All-American Girls Professional Baseball League players
Rockford Peaches players
Baseball players from Ohio
Burials at Forest Lawn Cemetery (Cathedral City)
People from Norwood, Ohio
Marquette University alumni
American LGBT sportspeople
LGBT baseball players
21st-century LGBT people
21st-century American women